Chumphon is a southern Province (changwat) of Thailand on the Gulf of Thailand. Neighbouring provinces are Prachuap Khiri Khan, Surat Thani, and Ranong. To the west it borders the Burmese province of Tanintharyi.

Geography
Chumphon is on the Isthmus of Kra, the narrow land bridge connecting the Malay Peninsula with the mainland of Thailand. To the west are the hills of the Phuket mountain range and its northern continuation, the Tenasserim Hills. The east is coastal plain abutting the Gulf of Thailand. The main river is the Lang Suan River, which originates in Phato District. With a  coastline and 44 islands, the Chumphon Archipelago, Chumphon has waterfalls, peaceful beaches, green forests, mangroves, and rivers. Chumphon is regarded as part of "Gateway to the South".

National parks
There are two national parks, along with nine other national parks, make up region 4 (Surat Thani) of Thailand's protected areas.
 Namtok Ngao National Park, 
 Mu Ko Chumphon National Park,

Wildlife sanctuaries
There are four wildlife sanctuaries, along with three other wildlife sanctuaries, make up region 4 (Surat Thani) of Thailand's protected areas.
 Khuan Mae Yai Mon Wildlife Sanctuary, 
 Thung Raya–Na Sak Wildlife Sanctuary, 
 Prince Chumphon South Park Wildlife Sanctuary, 
 Prince Chumphon North Park (lower) Wildlife Sanctuary,

History
The southern part of the province was originally a separate province named Lang Suan. It was incorporated into Chumphon in 1932.

In November 1989 Typhoon Gay hit the province hard: 529 people were killed, 160,000 became homeless,  of farm land was destroyed. Gay is the only tropical storm on record which reached Thailand with typhoon wind strength.

Chumphon province is one of several clandestine way stations on the trafficking trail of Burmese and Rohingyas from nearby Burma (Myanmar) being moved south. Chumphon borders the Burmese province of Tanintharyi.

Toponymy
There are two different theories on the origin of the name "Chumphon". According to one, it originates from Chumnumporn (lit., 'accumulation of forces') which derives from the fact that Chumphon was a frontier city. Another theory claims the name derives from a local tree named Maduea Chumphon (มะเดื่อชุมพร, Ficus glomerata), abundant in the province.

Symbols
The provincial seal shows a fortune-bringing thevada on a lotus-pedestal, flanked by two ficus trees. In the background a fort and two watchtowers are visible, a reference to the former camp where courageous warriors from the province gathered before going into battle against the enemy.

The provincial flower is the Indian shot (Canna indica), and the finger banana is another provincial symbol. Spanner barb (Barbodes lateristriga) is a provincial fish.

Administrative divisions

Provincial government
Chumphon is divided into eight districts (amphoes), 70 sub-districts (tambons), 736 villages (mubans).

Local government
As of 26 November 2019 there are: one Chumphon Provincial Administration Organisation and 27 municipal (thesaban) areas in the province. Chumphon and Lang Suan have town (thesaban mueang) status. Further 25 subdistrict municipalities (thesaban tambon). The non-municipal areas are administered by 51 Subdistrict Administrative Organisations - SAO (ongkan borihan suan tambon).

Economy
The coffee-growing valley of Ban Panwal in Tha Sae District includes 178,283 rai of robusta coffee plantations. It produces more than 24 million tonnes a year. Chumphon province contributes 60 percent of Thailand's total coffee production. Local brands include Thamsing, ST Chumphon, and Khao Tha-Lu Chumporn.

Besides, Chumphon  is considered as the province with the second largest durian growing area in the country, after Chanthaburi. Based on 2017 data, Chumphon has an area of 164,099 rai of durian, with a yield of approximately 128,894 tons, create income for the province of not less than 6,000 million baht per year. There are more farmers grow durian every year.

Human achievement index 2017

Since 2003, United Nations Development Programme (UNDP) in Thailand has tracked progress on human development at sub-national level using the Human achievement index (HAI), a composite index covering all the eight key areas of human development. National Economic and Social Development Board (NESDB) has taken over this task since 2017.

Transportation

Air
It has direct daily flights to Bangkok's Don Mueang Airport (DMK). Flights from Bangkok are around 60 minutes.

Nok Air and Thai AirAsia operates  flights between Bangkok (Don Mueang, DMK) and Chumphon Airport (CJM). The airport has transit agents for onward travel to Chumphon and the islands of the Gulf of Thailand  including Ko Tao, Ko Pha Ngan, and Ko Samui.

Rail

Chumphon is also the location of 26 other railway stations and railway halts. Lang Suan Railway Station in area of Lang Suan District is the last stop of the Southern Railway that starts from Thon Buri Railway Station (Bangkok Noi).

Road
Can travel to here by bus from both Southern Bus (Taling Chan) and Northern Bus Terminals (Mo Chit 2).

Tourism 
In the first 11 months of 2015, Chumphon arrivals grew by 17 percent to 1.86 million and tourism revenue by 21 percent to 7.55 billion baht. Average hotel occupancy rose to 65 percent from 53 percent in 2014. Arrivals are expected to grow by 17 percent in 2016.

Beaches 

Food and accommodation resorts and food stalls abound in the beach area.
This beach was ranked as the cleanest beach in the country by the Pollution Control Department in 2017. There is a fishing village named Ban Tha Samet, a large community that is known for making shrimp paste and fish sauce.

Hat Sai Ri: This beach has fine white sand and clear water. It is also the location of shrine of Prince Abhakara Kiartivongse, Prince of Chumphon, who was regarded as the "Father of the Royal Thai Navy". Nearby is the HTMS Chumphon, a torpedo boat. Hat Sai Ri and Prince of Chumphon Shrine are in Na Cha-ang Subdistrict, Mueang Chumphon District.

Gallery

Notable personalities 
 Baitong Jareerat Petsom (b. 1993) - Environmental advocate, scriptwriter, host, director and beauty pageant titleholder won as Miss Earth - Fire 2021

References

External links 

 Official homepage (Thai & English)
https://www.vanlifetribe.com/thung-wua-laen-beach-thailand/

 
Provinces of Thailand
Southern Thailand
Kra Isthmus
Gulf of Thailand